August ”Aku” Aleksander Korhonen (29 December 1892 in Käkisalmi − 5 September 1960 in Helsinki) was a Finnish theatre and film actor. During his career, he appeared in 76 films and received three Jussi Awards.

He is buried in the Hietaniemi Cemetery in Helsinki.

Selected filmography

 Suursalon häät (1924)
 Lapatossu (1937)
 Valkoiset ruusut (1943)
 Light Melody (1946)
 North Express (1947)
 Neljä rakkautta (1951)
 Noita palaa elämään (1952)
 Mother or Woman (1953)
 Morsiusseppele (1954)
 Helunan häämatka (1955)
 Silja – nuorena nukkunut (1956)

References

External links 
 

1892 births
1960 deaths
People from Priozersk
People from Viipuri Province (Grand Duchy of Finland)
Finnish male film actors
Finnish male silent film actors
Finnish male stage actors
20th-century Finnish male actors
Burials at Hietaniemi Cemetery